Jogayya is a 2011 Indian Kannada-language action drama film written and directed by Prem. starring Shiva Rajkumar in his 102nd film. It was produced under the banner of Prem Pictures. Rakshita Prem, who is married to the director Prem, is the producer of this film and the shooting began on his 49th birthday. It is the sequel to the 2005 blockbuster film Jogi. The film was released on 19 August 2011 in more than 200 theaters across Karnataka

Plot
Three years after the events of the first film, the cops capture and torture Madesha alias Jogi's  accomplices to reveal his current location, which leads them to a conclusion that Jogi has moved to Dubai. Upon release, they meet Bhubaiyya and verbally abuse Jogi for his betrayal. In Mumbai, Jogi works as a servant in Vidya's  father's house. He changed his name to Mahadeva in order to live a peaceful life. Vidya's marriage is fixed with an astrologer from Karnataka, who seems to vaguely recognise Madesha. This causes him to remember the events which caused him to leave his native. After his mother's death, Jogi continued to live the life of a goon, but changed his mind after getting humiliated by a doctor and mocked by his friends.

Knowing that once entering into the crime world will not provide him a second chance, Jogi leaves the place without informing anyone. Jogi decides to leave Mumbai as he is troubled by the presence of Vidya's fiancé. His fellow mates in Mumbai kills a gangster, who had destroyed their lives and secretly moves to a coastal region from where they plan to go to Dubai. Jogi, who spots them at the beach joins them, but before leaving the coast, they are cornered by the cops, who arrest Madesha and take him to Bangalore. While taking him to court, Jogi finds that Bhubaiyya has been killed in an accident. This shatters him. While at the court, Jogi learns that several people are awaiting his death, and is puzzled and equally heartbroken. Vidya, who has fallen for Jogi, calls off her wedding despite the warning from her fiancé that Jogi will die in six months and moves to Karnataka to save him.

Vidya seeks help from an advocate, who manages to prove Jogi's innocence. Once released from the prison, Jogi assembles his former gang and resumes his illegal activities. After escaping an attempt on his life, Jogi meets an aged person, who has a clear explanation regarding Madesha's earlier predicament. When Jogi left the crime world, the syndicate decides to meet a new gangster, who will allow them to resume their activities. Appanna volunteers to help them, and spreads terror and kills innocent people, where he makes Jogi as a scapegoat. Sensing the  danger, the aged person goes in search of Jogi and eventually finds him in Mumbai. With the help of police commissioner, the old man manages to bring back Jogi. Bhubaiyya was also killed by Appanna.

These revelations startle Jogi, who sets out to become a vigilante. He finishes the syndicate leaders, who framed him and goes in search of Appanna. Jogi solves the problems of people thereby gaining their support, and also receives a new title of Jogayya (Ayya is a term of respect). Having enough of the gang wars, the Chief minister of Karnataka asks the officials to prepare a list and encounter the goons. Appanna's mother seeks Jogi's help to save her son. In spite of having a burning desire to kill Appanna for destroying his life, Jogi decides to help the mother. However, Appanna is killed by the police. Jogi kills Naidu's brothers using a police gun, who backs the government.An enraged Naidu withdraws his support given to the government resulting in the party losing majority and conduction of elections.

Jogi decides to stand as a candidate, and is met by Vidya's father, who reveals about her love for him. He searches for Vidya, only to betrayed and brutally hacked by his Mumbai friends, who had recently visited him. However, Jogi manages to survive due to his love for Vidya, and the persons who hacked Jogi are murdered by his friends. He sees the people who gathered around to see him. It is here revealed that the idea of murdering Naidu's brothers and the mafia leaders were given by the common men, who were inspired by Jogi's good deeds. Jogi reconsider his decision to contest in election and reunites with Vidya. The people inspired by Jogi's speech swears to elect only those candidates who are eligible and capable.

Cast
 Shiva Rajkumar as Madesha (Mahadeva) alias Jogi
 Sumit Kaur Atwal as Vidya Gokhale
 Pooja Gandhi as an advocate
 Ravishankar Gowda
Narasimha Joshi 
Vijay Anand 
Umesh Punga 
John 
Mass Madha 
Shankar 
B. Ganapathi 
Gururaj Hosakote 
Narendra Babu 
Nanda Kumar 
Prakash Shenoy 
Aravind Rao 
Suresh Mangalore

Production
The film was launched on 12 July 2010 in an event attended by South Indian film stars like Ambareesh, Chiranjeevi, Vijay and Surya. The songs of the film have been lavishly picturized. It is reported that the song shooting of odale has cost Prem 1.5 crores. In Haridwar, 300 sadhus (saints) were used for shooting this song which uses 3D technology. The film has been shot in Bengaluru, Mysore, Mumbai, Haridwar, Hrishikesh & other holy places of North India.

Release
Due to the success of the film Jogi in 2005, there has been a tremendous interest generated for Jogayya in 2011. Although the film was scheduled to be released on 19 August, tickets of first three days were issued one week in advance. Within a few hours after initiating booking, all 3 days' tickets were sold out in the BKT region (Bengaluru, Kolar and Tumkur) of Karnataka. Black tickets being sold at exorbitant rates of up to 3,000 per ticket was reported. The movie has started seeing empty halls since the eighth week and has subsequently been replaced.

Reception

Critical response 

A critic from The Times of India scored the film at 4 out of 5 stars and says "While Sumit Kaur has done justice to his role, Payana Ravishankar proves lively with dialogue delivery and body language. Pooja Gandhi impresses all in her role as a lawyer. Music director V Harikrishna deserves special mention for his brilliant numbers. Not to miss, Narendra Babu has some catchy dialogues in store for you".

Shruti Indira Lakshminarayana from Rediff.com scored the film at 2 out of 5 stars and says "The actor has the same energy, innocence and aura of Jogi. His body language and expressions do the talking. He gets his emotions right all the way. He also experiments with his looks and costumes. Pooja Gandhi is cast in small role. Heroine Sumeet Kaur is mostly limited to songs. Jogi was undoubtedly more powerful than Jogayya". A critic from The New Indian Express wrote "Hari Krishna's music and Nanda Kumar's camera work remain the strong elements of the film. Narendra Babu's dialogues lack punch. ‘Jogayya’ can be watched only for Shivaraj Kumar's excellent performance in his 100th film".

B S Srivani from Deccan Herald wrote "The overall effect of the film is of pixels all beautiful in their own right, but unable to make a meaningful montage. Or perhaps, is it a case of expecting too much?". A critic from News18 India wrote "Shivaraj Kumar excels in his role. His body language, dialogue delivery and even styling is perfect".

Soundtrack
The film's music album was released on 19 May 2011. Jogayya has eight songs (including a theme) composed by V. Harikrishna and Ashwini Recording Company has bought the music rights of the film. More than 100,000 CDs and cassettes were sold within 5 days of music release, which is a record in Kannada Film Industry. Over 60,000 records were sold on the first day of market launch.

Notes

References

External links
 

2011 action films
2011 3D films
2011 films
Indian 3D films
Indian satirical films
Indian political satire films
Films scored by V. Harikrishna
Indian sequel films
Indian films about revenge
Indian gangster films
Films about organised crime in India
2010s Kannada-language films
Films directed by Prem